River Mill Hydroelectric Project, also known as River Mill Dam and Station M, is a hydroelectric dam and powerhouse in Clackamas County, Oregon, United States. It is just north of Estacada, Oregon, on the Clackamas River at river mile 23.5 (km 37.8). It received its name from being near a sawmill that was located along the river.

The dam has been in continuous production of hydroelectric power since 1911, when its construction was funded by the Portland Railway, Light and Power Company. It was one of four related projects on the Clackamas River:  the Oak Grove Hydroelectric Project (developed 1923–56), the North Fork dam (1958), and the Faraday Dam (1907–10), all upstream (south) of River Mill.  All but Faraday, demolished 2018, are still owned and operated by the successor company, Portland General Electric.

The principal designer of the original Mill Run Dam was the Norwegian immigrant Nils F. Ambursen (1876–1958). Based in Boston, his Ambursen Hydraulic Construction Company designed over a hundred dams in the United States from 1903 through 1917. Ambursen's patented concrete-slab-and-buttress dam design was a significant advance in dam design of this era. River Mill is one of only three Ambursen-type dams built west of the Mississippi, and evidently the only one to survive.

The project is listed on the National Register of Historic Places, and in the Oregon Historic Sites Database of the Oregon State Historic Preservation Office.

References

External links

 

Energy infrastructure completed in 1911
National Register of Historic Places in Clackamas County, Oregon
Buildings and structures in Clackamas County, Oregon
Dams in Oregon
Portland General Electric dams
Hydroelectric power plants in Oregon
1911 establishments in Oregon
Dams on the National Register of Historic Places in Oregon
Industrial buildings and structures on the National Register of Historic Places in Oregon
Energy infrastructure on the National Register of Historic Places